The Examination for the Certificate in Proficiency in English (ECPE) is an advanced level English language qualification that focuses on Level C2 of the Common European Framework of Reference for Languages (CEFR).

It is developed by CaMLA, a not-for-profit collaboration between the University of Michigan and the University of Cambridge. The exam has been in use since 1953,  but is regularly updated to ensure it reflects current research in language teaching and assessment.

The ECPE is taken by school-aged and adult learners living in countries where the common language is not English. It is used as official documentary evidence of English language proficiency. Results (issued in the last two years) are accepted by universities, governments and employers around the world.

The exam has four test sections, which test the four key language skills: listening, reading, writing and speaking.

Test format

The ECPE is a paper-and pencil test, with the following test sections:

The texts and tasks in the exam reflect a range of personal, public, occupational and educational situations that they might encounter in real-life. The topics are designed to be accessible to all ages and test takers do not require specialized knowledge or experience to complete the test.

A new test form is developed each time the exam is administered.

Scoring

Test takers receive a CaMLA score report, which has the following information:
 A score for each section (0–1,000), with a brief description of the test taker’s performance
 An overall result (Honors/Pass/Fail), which is calculated by averaging the scores received for each section.

The following scores are needed to achieve a Honors/Pass/Fail result:

Test takers who achieve an overall score of 650 or higher are awarded the ECPE Certificate. Test takers who achieve a score of 840 or higher in all four sections are awarded a Certificate of Proficiency with Honors. The ECPE Certificate is recognized at the C2 level of the Common European Framework of Reference for Languages (CEFR).

Test takers are given a numeric score for each section of the test so they can see the areas in which they have done well and the areas in which they need to improve.

An ECPE qualification is valid for life. It is accepted by many universities as proof of proficiency in English, provided it has been received within the last two years prior to the commencement of one's studies. However, as language abilities may diminish over time, educational institutions are advised to consider a test taker’s competence in English since they took the test, along with their test scores.

Usage
The ECPE is used as official documentary evidence of English language proficiency. It is accepted by universities, governments and employers in many countries around the world, including:
 Albania (e.g. Ministry of Education and Science) 
 Argentina (e.g. Universidad Católica Argentina (UCA))
 Bolivia (e.g. Centro Boliviano Americano Fundación Cultural y Educativa)
 Brazil (e.g. Banco do Brasil)
 Chile (e.g. Universidad Tecnológica de Chile (INACAP))
 Colombia (e.g. Ministry of National Education)
 Costa Rica (e.g. Intensa)
 Denmark (e.g. Aarhus University)
 Finland (e.g. University of Helsinki Erasmus Exchange)
 Greece (e.g. Supreme Council for Civil Personnel Selection)
 Iran (e.g. Soroor Language Institute)
 Italy (e.g. Free University of Bozen-Bolzano)
 Jordan (e.g. Princess Sumaya University for Technology)
 Malaysia (e.g. Lincoln University College)
 Mexico (e.g. Mexican Ministry of Education))
 Netherlands (e.g. Marnix Academie)
 Peru (e.g. University of Lima)
 Romania (e.g. Ministry of Education and Scientific Research)
 Spain (e.g. Universitat de Barcelona)
 UK (e.g. University of Manchester, Manchester Business School)
 United States (e.g. University of California, Davis)
 Uruguay (e.g. Instituto de Profesores Artigas (IPA)).

In 2014, the ECPE was used by test takers with 33 different first language backgrounds (the largest being Albanian, Arabic, Greek, Portuguese and Spanish). It is mainly used by test takers at school, university or in the early stages of their careers:

Most test takers said they took the ECPE for employment purposes (33%), educational purposes (31%) or for personal interest (27%).

Preparation
Free practice tests, answer keys and student instructions are available on the official website, along with links to other practice materials.

See also
 CaMLA 
 CaMLA English Placement Test (EPT)
 Examination for the Certificate of Competency in English (ECCE) 
 MTELP Series 
 Michigan English Language Assessment Battery (MELAB) 
 Michigan English Test (MET) 
 Young Learners Tests of English (YLTE) 
 Cambridge English Language Assessment 
 English as a Foreign or Second Language

External links
 Official website

References

ESOL
CaMLA assessments
English-language education
English as a second or foreign language
Standardized tests for English language